Viļāni Municipality is a former municipality in Latgale, Latvia. The municipality was formed in 2009 by merging Dekšāres Parish, Sokolki Parish, Viļāni Parish and Viļāni town; the administrative centre being Viļāni. The population as of 2020 was 5,417.

On 1 July 2021, Viļāni Municipality ceased to exist and its territory was merged into Rēzekne Municipality.

See also 
 Administrative divisions of Latvia (2009)

References 

 
Former municipalities of Latvia